KEOM (88.5 FM) is a non-commercial educational high school radio station based in Mesquite, Texas. It is operated by the Mesquite Independent School District and broadcasts to the greater Dallas–Fort Worth Metroplex.

KEOM broadcasts in HD Radio.

History
The station was founded by Dr. Ralph Poteet, former MISD Superintendent, to present community information in a way not possible via commercial radio stations, and to provide MISD students having interest in radio and communications with hands-on radio experience.  The air staff is primarily made up of students from the five high schools in the city taking radio production classes.

The station signed on the air September 4, 1984, on 88.3 FM with 3,000 watts on a  tower. It moved to 88.5 and increased its power to 61,000 watts in 1992 upon the completion of a new  City/School Communications Tower at Mesquite Memorial Stadium.

Programming
KEOM airs live broadcasts of high school sports from MISD schools. The station also broadcasts music primarily from the 1970s to the 1990s. KEOM is a station that signs on the air every day at 7 a.m. with the National Anthem.

KEOM is one of a few secondary stations containing the North Texas Emergency Alert System that sends messages from primaries WBAP and KSCS.

Comparing KEOM and KLUV, its competitor in the Dallas area, the station contains a more enhanced and larger playlist than KLUV, the other Classic Hits station utilizing significantly more repetitions and having a more power songs-oriented playlist than KEOM.

Awards and honors
The station was named "Best Blast from the Past" in the 2007 Dallas Observer "Best of Dallas" rankings.

Signal
Unlike most of the area's FM stations like competitor KLUV, which transmit their signals from Cedar Hill, KEOM transmits its signal from an area southwest of Mesquite. Its signal is also highly directional, transmitting very little signal directly to the west. Therefore, KEOM's signal is much stronger in most of Dallas County as well as the cities in the eastern portion of the Dallas/Fort Worth Metroplex including Waxahachie, McKinney, and Terrell to as far east as Canton, but is considerably weaker west of DFW.

See also
List of community radio stations in the United States

References

External links
KEOM official website
Mesquite ISD official website

 DFW Radio/TV History

EOM
Classic hits radio stations in the United States
Soft adult contemporary radio stations in the United States
Community radio stations in the United States
High school radio stations in the United States
Radio stations established in 1984
1984 establishments in Texas